Faddiley is a civil parish in Cheshire East, England. It contains twelve buildings that are recorded in the National Heritage List for England as designated listed buildings.  Of these, one is listed at Grade I, the highest grade, one is listed at Grade II*, the middle grade, and the others are at Grade II.  Apart from small settlements, the parish is rural, and most of the listed buildings are houses, cottages, and farm buildings.  The other listed buildings are the remains of an ancient cross, a private chapel and its enclosure, and a public house.

Key

Buildings

See also

Listed buildings in Baddiley
Listed buildings in Brindley
Listed buildings in Burland
Listed buildings in Cholmondeley
Listed buildings in Chorley
Listed buildings in Ridley
Listed buildings in Spurstow

References
Citations

Sources

 

Listed buildings in the Borough of Cheshire East
Lists of listed buildings in Cheshire